Exto Partners is a private investment venture capital firm based in Sydney, Australia that has invested in early stage Australian companies.

History 
Exto Partners was founded in 2003   by William Deane, a former lawyer with Skadden, Arps, Slate, Meagher & Flom, and Peter Hammond, a former management consultant with BearingPoint. The company made its first investment in a biotech company in March 2003 and has since invested across a broad array of industries in seed, A round and follow-on funding.

Exto Partners is considered an active investor that works with founders to build their business globally.

Exto Partners investee companies have grown to operate on multiple continents 
and have successfully obtained Commercialisation Australia  and other government grants.

Among Exto Partner’s most notable investments are Cleantech 100 company BuildingIQ, Inc., ASX listed education company RedHill Education [ASX:RDH] and task marketplace Airtasker.

In August 2015, Exto Partners invested in Beat the Q Posse Group alongside Westpac's Reinventure fund.  Beat the Q is behind the Hey You order ahead, discovery and digital loyalty app.

Investments 

Exto Partners has investments in Airtasker, Tuned Global, RedHill Education, BuildingIQ, WhiteSky Labs, Optalert, Sensear, Ondek, Contours Australia,  EnVie Fitness and Beat the Q Posse Group.

Management 

 Peter Hammond - Managing Director
 Will Deane - Managing Director

Source:

References

External links 
 

Financial services companies based in Sydney
Financial services companies established in 2003 
Australian companies established in 2003
2003 establishments in Australia